Estadio Municipal de San Felipe is a football stadium in San Felipe, Chile.  It is the home stadium of Unión San Felipe. 
The stadium was opened in 1958, and currently holds 12,000 people.

External links
Official Page stadium information

Football venues in Chile
Sports venues in Valparaíso Region